Duncan Peter James Spender (born 18 June 1975) is a former Australian politician. He briefly served as a Senator for New South Wales in 2019, filling a casual vacancy caused by the resignation of Senator David Leyonhjelm of the Liberal Democrats. He had previously been Leyonhjelm's chief of staff.

Early life
Spender was born in Brisbane. He is the son of former Federal Court (and Industrial Court) judge, Jeffrey Spender.

Spender was a founding member of the Liberal Democratic Party in 2001. Before his appointment to the Senate, Spender worked as Leyonhjelm's chief of staff and senior adviser, and as the party's treasurer.

Senate
Spender was appointed to the Senate on 20 March 2019, following Leyonhjelm's decision to resign to contest the Legislative Council at the 2019 New South Wales state election. As the Parliament of New South Wales was dissolved for the election, Spender's appointment was made by the Governor, David Hurley, with the appointment to be endorsed by the parliament in its next session. This occurred on 8 May 2019.

Spender's seat was for a term that ended on 30 June 2019. He sat in the Senate for just two days, and Senate Estimates for two days. He was a candidate at the 2019 Australian federal election, but was not successful, ending the LDP's representation in the Senate.

Post-politics
In November 2019 Spender was appointed CEO of the Multicultural Council of Tasmania.

References

Living people
Members of the Australian Senate
Members of the Australian Senate for New South Wales
Liberal Democratic Party members of the Parliament of Australia
1975 births
People from Brisbane